The 1865 Atlantic hurricane season included two landfalling hurricanes, with one that caused over 325 deaths. The first storm was reported on May 30 by ships in the western Caribbean. A month later, a storm hit southern Texas, and in late August, a storm paralleled the coastline of the Carolinas. The fourth storm of the season was also the longest-lasting, forming east of the Lesser Antilles before hitting Guadeloupe and eventually moving ashore in Louisiana. In both of its major landfalls, the storm left many houses destroyed. There was confusion whether or not the fifth storm of the season was separate from the fourth storm, as both systems struck Louisiana in September. Another hurricane occurred in late September, before the final storm of the season developed north of Panama. The final hurricane struck Cuba and Key West, Florida before dissipating north of Bermuda on October 25.

At one time, one hurricane researcher identified a tropical storm over Cuba in late August, although there was no evidence the storm actually existed. There was also a report of a hurricane over Louisiana on October 22, although it is unknown if it was related to other storms in the season. There may have been additional unconfirmed tropical cyclones during the season. Meteorologist Christopher Landsea estimates up to six storms were missed from the official database, due to small tropical cyclone size, sparse ship reports, and relatively unpopulated coastlines.



Timeline

Systems

Tropical Storm One
On May 30, a tropical storm in the western Caribbean Sea wrecked a ship named the "Golden Rule", which was sailing from New York to the east coast of Nicaragua. The ship first encountered the storm on May 29, reporting high winds and heavy rainfall. After the wreck, the crew sailed to a nearby island, where they were rescued by two United States ships after 10 days.

Tropical Storm Two
The second known storm of the season was reported near Brownsville, Texas on June 30. Its existence is known based on a newspaper report in the New Orleans Times. The entire track of the storm is unknown. It is possible that a Tropical Depression reported by newspapers 1 day later was the same as this one, except at a lower intensity and wind speed.

Tropical Storm Three

A ship off the coast of Hatteras, North Carolina sustained damage from a storm on August 20. Further ship reports indicated the tropical storm maintained a general northeast track off the North Carolina coastline. On August 22 the storm made its closest approach to the state, and while remaining offshore it produced winds of around  along the coast. On August 23, high waves from the storm left one ship's cargo a complete wreck. It was last observed on August 24 to the southeast of Nantucket.

Hurricane Four

The Sabine River-Lake Calcasieu Hurricane of 1865 

The fourth tropical cyclone of the season, also the longest-lasting, was first observed on September 6 to the east of the Lesser Antilles. A small cyclone, it tracked westward and struck Guadeloupe as a fully developed hurricane. Many residents in the small nearby island of Marie-Galante evacuated to Guadeloupe, but some died in the attempt. In Îles des Saintes, the hurricane destroyed all but two buildings. Damage was similarly heavy in Basse-Terre. The overall death toll was estimated at 300, including 36 on Marie-Galante. After moving through the Lesser Antilles, the hurricane moved through the Caribbean Sea, passing between Jamaica and Haiti and bypassing Cuba to the south.

Upon moving ashore, the hurricane produced high tides as far east as the mouth of the Mississippi River, in addition to as far inland as Calcasieu Lake, Louisiana. Three towns were destroyed, causing two of them to be abandoned. Across the state, there were 25 deaths, many of them in Leesburg. In neighboring Texas, damage was greatest in Orange, where 196 homes were destroyed out of the 200 in the town. The hurricane capsized 19 boats in the Sabine River, causing multiple deaths. The hurricane weakened over Louisiana and dissipated over Arkansas on September 14. It was also known as the "Sabine River-Lake Calcasieu Storm".

Tropical Storm Five
A tropical storm struck the south-central Louisiana coast on September 7, while the previous system was located over the Caribbean. The track was incomplete, and there was a possibility that the storm was misreported as the previous hurricane.

Hurricane Six
On September 28, a ship encountered a hurricane to the northeast of the Turks and Caicos islands. The winds in the hurricane extended far to the northwest, and high waves affected the southeast United States coast from Charleston, South Carolina to Cape Hatteras. The hurricane's track is unknown.

Hurricane Seven

The final tropical cyclone of the season formed on October 18, just north of the coast of Panama. The storm brushed the country's coast with high waves for several days, causing $300,000 in damage (1865 USD). Moving north-northwestward, the storm intensified into a hurricane by October 21 over the western Caribbean. After turning more to the north, it struck Cuba, producing strong winds that destroyed the roof of the Belen College Observatory in Havana. In the city, the hurricane destroyed several boats and houses.

Rainfall totaled  over a three-day period. In nearby Fort Jefferson in the Dry Tortugas, the hurricane destroyed one building and damaged several others, killing one person. It later moved across the Florida mainland, weakening slightly. It is possible that this hurricane crossed over from the Pacific, however Pacific records are inaccurate at this time. About a dozen ships encountered the hurricane across the western Atlantic, before the storm was last observed on October 25 north of Bermuda.

See also

List of tropical cyclones
Atlantic hurricane season
Tropical cyclone observation
Atlantic hurricane reanalysis project

References

Atlantic hurricane seasons
 
1865 meteorology
Articles which contain graphical timelines
1865 natural disasters